Robert H. Rose House, also known as Rose Mansion, was a historic home located at Binghamton in Broome County, New York, United States. It was demolished in 1980.

It was listed on the National Register of Historic Places in 1980.

References

Houses in Binghamton, New York
Buildings and structures demolished in 1980
Houses on the National Register of Historic Places in New York (state)
Houses completed in 1896
National Register of Historic Places in Broome County, New York